Ruzin may refer to:
Nano Ružin (b. 1952), Macedonian academic
Ruzhin Kerimov (b. 1956), Bulgarian footballer
Ruzin, Iran, a village in Kermanshah Province, Iran